Zhang Luyi (born 7 June 1980), also known as Edward Zhang, is a Chinese actor and director.

Background and career
Zhang first studied film direction at the Central Academy of Drama in Beijing, before entering Peking University where he obtained a master's degree. He had a few minor roles in film and television before gaining attention for his role in a TV production The Red  in 2014.  He has since played major parts in a number of films and television series, including The Devotion of Suspect X , Love Me if You Dare, and Sparrow.

Filmography

Film

Television series

Awards and nominations

References

External links

1980 births
Male actors from Beijing
Central Academy of Drama alumni
21st-century Chinese male actors
Chinese male television actors
Chinese male film actors
Living people